Richard England (born Richard England Sant Fournier on 3 October 1937) is a Maltese architect, writer, artist and academic.

Biography

Son of Edwin England Sant Fournier and Ina Desain, Richard studied at St. Edward's College, and later graduated in Architecture at the University of Malta.  He then continued his studies in Italy at the Polytechnic University of Milan and also worked as a student-architect in the studio of the Italian architect-designer in Gio Ponti in 1960-62.

He is also a sculptor, photographer, poet, artist and author of a number of books. He is a Visiting Professor at the University of Malta, having acted as Dean of the Faculty of Architecture between 1987 and 1989.  He is also an Hon. Fellow at the University of Bath in the UK, and an Academician and Vice-President of the International Academy of Architecture.

England has lectured and exhibited his work in North and South America, the UK, Europe, the Middle and as far East as Russia. During the 1970s he worked in Saudi Arabia while in the early 80s he was appointed, together with Robert Venturi, Arup Associates, Arthur Erickson, Sheppard Robson and Ricardo Bofill as a consultant to the Mayoralty of Baghdad, Iraq to work on the rehabilitation of the city under the Mayoralty's architect Rifat Chadirji.

His philosophy centers on an expression referred to by Charles Knevitt as "a valid, contemporary regionalism", preferring a process of evolution as opposed to revolution, “a new leaf as opposed to a new tree”, believing that architecture should be appropriate to both place and time and that it should evoke the spirit of the place.

Richard England has lectured and worked in the capacity of Architectural Consultant to governmental and private institutions in the following countries: US, UK, Yugoslavia, Saudi Arabia, Iraq, Iran, Italy, Argentina, Poland, Bulgaria, Russia, Kazakhstan and his native Malta.

He married Myriam Borg Manduca in 1962 and has one daughter and one son.

Style

Critical response
“Richard England’s restless mind and nervous energy find expression in so many different artistic fields that it leaves one breathless”.

“His architecture intense, sunny, rich in pure forms, bejewelled with bright colours …works designed with imagination, ingenuity and indisputable, creative passion”.

“A style of his own, successfully relating to the elements of the island’s tradition. Malta is fortunate to have him to lead the profession on the island”.

“The Garden of Apollo …a real coup de grace where the architect’s imagination, artistic myths and cultural realities merge to provide a fitting reminder of this architect’s amazing talents”.

“Richard England played an active part in building up the Malta tourist industry designing a series of resort hotels which set a new standard for the type”.

Selected works

 Central Bank of Malta, Valletta, Malta, 1971
 Church of St Joseph, Manikata, Malta, 1962-1974
 A Garden for Myriam, St. Julians, Malta, 1982
 Aquasun Lido, Paceville, Malta, 1983
 Dar il-Ħanin Samaritan, Santa Venera, Malta, 1996-2014
 Ir-Razzett ta’ Sandrina, Mgarr, Malta, 1988
 Papal Stands for Pope John Paul II Malta Visit, 1990 + 2001
 Golf 4 Apartments, Belgrade, ex-Yugoslavia, 1990
 St Francis of Assisi Church and Cloister in the neighbourhood, Qawra, Malta, 1990–1996
 University of Malta extension, Malta, 1991
 Villa ‘G’, Siggiewi, Malta, 1994
 Central Bank of Malta Annexe, Valletta, Malta, 1992
 Valletta Entrance Masterplan (Project), Malta, 1994–2000
 National Arts Centre (Project), Valletta, Malta, 1997
 Millennium Chapel, Paceville, Malta, 2000
 Malta Parliament (Project), Valletta, Malta, 2002
 San Gorg Meditation Chapel, Blata L-Bajda, Malta, 2001
 Filfla Chapel (Project), Malta, 2002
 Hal Farrug Church (Project), Malta, 2004
 The Garden of Apollo, St Julians, Malta, 2007

Awards

 International Academy of Architecture Award, 1983, 1985, 1991, 2000, 2003, 2006,2009
 Commonwealth Association of Architects Regional Award, 1985, 1987
 Honoris Causa, University of Buenos Aires, Argentina, 1985
 Gold Medal of the City of Toulouse, 1985
 International Committee of Architectural Critics (CICA) Silver Medal, 1987
 Honoris Causa, Institute of Advance Studies, University of New York, US, 1987
 Georgia Biennale Laureate Prize, 1988
 IFRAA – American Institute of Architects, Award for Religious Architecture, 1991
 Officer of the Order of Merit, Malta, 1993
 Honoris Causa, University of the Republic of Georgia, 1995
 International Prize Third Architectural Biennal, Costa Rica, 1996
 Gold Medal of the Belgrade Architectural Triennial, 1999
 Honorary Fellowship - American Institute of Architects, 1999
 Honoris Causa, University of Sofia, Bulgaria, 2003
 International Academy of Architecture Grand Prix, 2006
 Honoris Causa, University Spiru Haret, Romania, 2010

Publications by Richard England

Books
 Walls of Malta,  M.R.S.M., Malta, 1973.
 White is White, M.R.S.M., Malta, 1973.
 Contemporary Art in Malta, editor and contributor, A Malta Art Festival Publication, Malta, 1974.
 Carrier-Citadel Metamorphosis, M.R.S.M., Malta, 1980.
 Island:  A poem for seeing, M.R.S.M., Malta, 1980.
 Uncaged Reflections, selected writings 1965 - 80, M.R.S.M., Malta, 1980.
 In Search of Silent Spaces, M.R.S.M., Malta, 1983.
 Octaves of Reflection, with Charles Camilleri, A John Arthur Studio Publication, London, 1987.
 Eye to I, selected poems, Said International, Malta, 1994.
 Mdina.  Citadel of Memory, with Conrad Thake, Atlantis Publications, Malta, 1995.
 FRAXIONS,  LIBRiA, Italy, 1995.
 Sacri Luoghi, LIBRiA, Italy, 1997.
 Gozo.  Island of Oblivion LIBRiA, Italy. 1997.
 Scripta Mediterranea, Richard England Poet of Malta and the Middle Sea, Brian Dendle, Canadian Institute for Mediterranean Studies, Canada, 1997.
 Transfigurations - Places of Prayer, with Linda Schubert, LIBRiA, Italy.  2000.
 Gabriel Caruana, A Bank of Valletta Exhibition, catalogue, Malta.  2001
 Gabriel Caruana, Ceramics LIBRiA, Italy. 2002
 Viaggio In Italia, schizzi e disegni, Introduzione Paolo Portoghesi, LIBRiA, Italy. 2002
 The Palette, John Borg Manduca, LIBRiA, Italy. 2004.
 Between Sky + Earth, Norbert Attard, Heritage Malta, Malta. 2007.

Poetry
 Sanctuaries, Selected poems, LIBRiA, Italy. 2006.
 Clavichords, Selected poems, LIBRiA, Italy. 2009.
 Richard England Poems set to music on CD by Charles Camilleri:
 Standing Stones – Ann Manly Soprano, DIAL 105, 1991
 This Holy Earth – Claire Massa Mezzo Soprano, THE 011, 2007

Articles
 From Vernacular to Modern, Architecture Review, Architectural Press, London, July 1969.
 Forms borrowed from the summer of my childhood, A+U 10, Japan, 1984.
 Various quotations, Perspectives, Charles Knevitt, Lund Humphries, London, 1986.
 The Spirit of Place, Transactions 9, Vol 5.1, RIBA Publications, London, 1986.
 The Spirit of Place, Sharing the Earth, The Robert Gordon University, Aberdeen, Scotland, 1995.
 Building in Harmony with Nature, Econea, L’Arca 152, Milan, Italy, 2000.
 Luis Barragan, El Poeta del Silencio, Cuadernos de Arquitectura 6, El Legado de Luis Barragan, Instituto Nacional de Bellas Artes, Mexico, 2002.
 L’Architettura del Mediterraneo: Conservazione Transformazione, Innovazione, L’Architettura del Mediterraneo, Gangemi, Italy, 2003.
 Space, Time, Genealogy, Malta Before History, Miranda Publishers, Malta, 2004.
 Transfiguration, St James Cavalier Centre for Creativity Malta, Libria, Italy, 2005.
 Landscape No. 27, Jordan, 2009.
 The Making of the Millennium Chapel, Going Your Way, Progress Press, Malta, 2010.
 Deir El Bahri Memorial, Senmut & Hatshepsut, L’Arca 254, Milan, Italy, 2010.
 Limestone Heritage, L’Arca 257, Milan, Italy, 2010.

Publications on Richard England

Books
 Richard England, Architect in Malta, Emile Henvaux.  Editions de la Libraire Encyclopedique, Belgium, 1969.
 Cards on the Table:  Concept Drawings by Richard England, Maelee Thomson Foster, M.R.S.M., Malta.  1980.  Second edition, revised and enlarged, 1983.
 Manikata:  The Making of a Church, Charles Knevitt, a Manikata Church Publication, Malta, 1980.  Second Edition, 1986.
 Connections:  The Architecture of Richard England, Charles Knevitt, Lund Humphries, United Kingdom, 1984.
 Transformations:  Richard England, 25 Years of Architecture, Chris Abel, Mid-Med Bank Limited, Malta, 1987.
 Manikata Church Malta, Chris Abel, Academy Editions, United Kingdom, 1995.
 Richard England, The Spirit of Place, l'ARCA Edizioni, Italy, 1998.
 Richard England, by Edwin Heathcote, Wiley-Academy, United Kingdom, 2002.
 Richard England Architect as Artist, Editor Dennis Sharp, Texts Manfredi Nicoletti and Mario Botta, BookART, London, 2007.
 100 at 70 A Celebratory Album for Richard England, M.R.S.M., Malta.  2007.
 Between Shadow & Stone, Photography by Timmy Gambin, Midsea Books, Malta, 2010.

Articles
 Fortress, Quentin Hughes, Progress Press, Malta, 1970.
 Architecture + Society No. 6, Bulgaria, 1987.
 The A.D. 100 Architects, Architectural Design, US, 1991.
 Architettura e Spazio Sacro nella Modernita, Biennal di Venezia Catalogue, Abitare Segesta, Venice, Italy, 1992.
 L’Industria delle Costruzioni No. 248, Edil Stampa, Rome, Italy, 1992.
 Materia No. 19, Italy, 1993.
 Demetra No. 5, Sicily, 1993.
 Projeto No. 173, Brazil, 1994.
 581 Architects in the World, Masayuki Fuchigami, Toto Shuppan, Tokyo, 1995.
 Church Builders, Edwin Heathcote + Iona Spens, Academy Editions, London, 1997.
 Europe, The Contemporary Architecture Guide, Masayuki Fuchigami, Tokyo, 1998.
 Dekorasyon No. 1, Turkey, 1998.
 Bank Buildings, Edwin Heathcote, Wiley-Academy, London, 2000.
 20th Century Architecture – A Visual History, Dennis Sharp, Images, Australia, 2002.
 Contro Spazio  No. 5, Italy, 2002.
 Malta, War and Peace, Conrad Thake + Quentin Hughes, Midsea Books, Malta, 2005.
 World Architects 51, Masayuki Fuchigami, Art Design Publishing, Japan, 2007.
 Concrete Quarterly, Dennis Sharp, London, 2008.
 ADA No. 8, Pakistan, 2009.
 Who's Who, Europa Publications, London & New York, 2010.
 L’Arca Nos. 157, 207, 235, Italy.

References

1937 births
Living people
20th-century Maltese architects
21st-century Maltese architects
Postmodern architects
University of Malta alumni
Academic staff of the University of Malta
Academics of the University of Bath
Architects of Roman Catholic churches